Democratic Centre or Democratic Center may refer to:
Democratic Center (Colombia)
Democratic Centre (Croatia)
Democratic Center (Ecuador)
Democratic Centre (France)
Democratic Centre (Italy)
Democratic Centre (Latvia), existed during the 1920s and 1930s
Democratic Center Party of Latvia, existed during the 1990s
Democratic Centre (North Macedonia) (est. 2002)
Democratic Centre (Serbia)
Democratic Centre of Boka, Montenegro
Democratic Center Party of Mexico
Democratic Centre Union (Switzerland)
Union of the Democratic Centre (Spain)
Democratic Center Party (Turkey)

See also 
 Union of the Democratic Centre (disambiguation)
 Democrat (disambiguation)
 Center (disambiguation)